= Kodak Easyshare C1013 =

Kodak digital camera

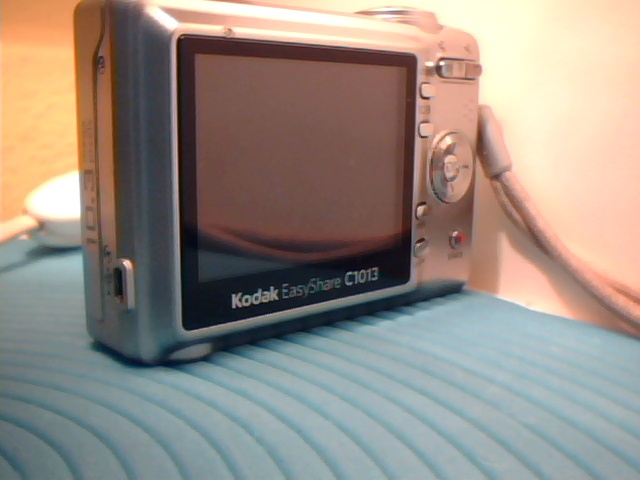
Kodak EasyShare C1013

The Kodak Easyshare C1013 is a digital camera made by Kodak. It features a 10-megapixel camera with 3× optical zoom; a 2.4-inch colour LCD; digital image stabilization; high ISO setting (up to 1000); video capture; 16 scene modes and three colour modes; on-camera picture enhancement and editing tools; 16 MB on-camera storage, expandable with an SD card, and a USB 2.0 connection.

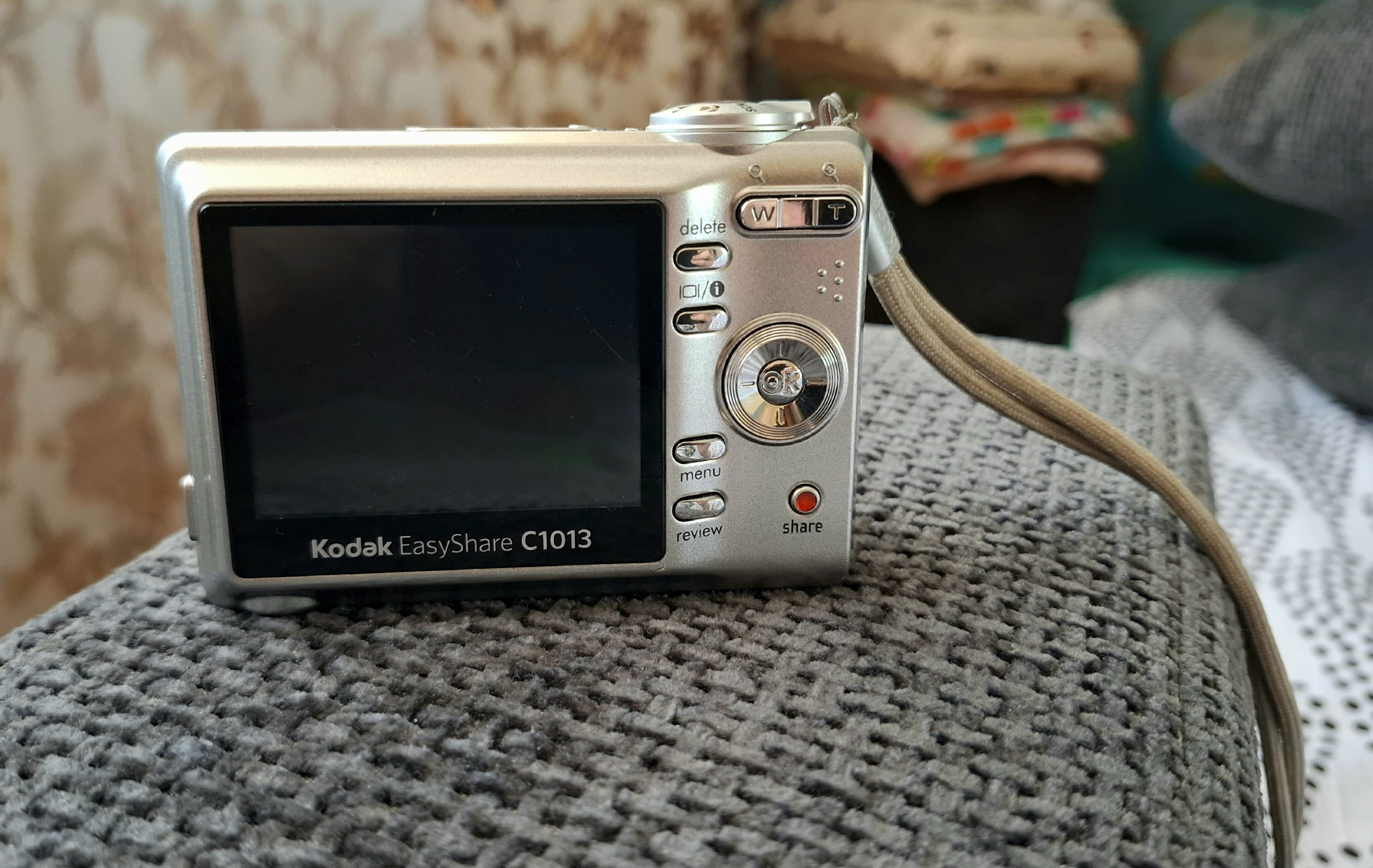
A photo with a Kodak EasyShare C1013 camera
